Sikandar is the Persian rendition of the name Alexander. When the Greek king Alexander the Great conquered Persia, the Persians called him Sikandar, meaning "defender" or "warrior". It is a variant of Iskandar.

People

Rulers
 Alexander the Great, also known as Sikandar-i-Azam
 Sikandar Khan Ghazi, first wazir of Sylhet
 Sikandar Shah Miri, (also referred to as Sikandar 'Butshikan'), Sultan of Kashmir
 Sikandar Lodi of the Lodi dynasty
 Sikandar Shah, 2nd Ilyas Shahi Sultan of Bengal
 Nuruddin Sikandar Shah, Sultan of Bengal
 Sikandar Shah Suri, Sultan of new Delhi

Other people
 Sikandar Hayat Khan, British Raj politician
 Sikandar Khan Khoso, Pakistani politician and poet
 Sikandar Kher, Indian actor
 Sikandar Jah, also known as Mir Akbar Ali Khan Sikander Jah, Asaf Jah III, ruler of Hyderabad
 Sikandar Sultan, Pakistani businessman
 Sikander Bakht, Indian politician
 Sikander Bakht, Pakistani cricketer
 Sikandar Raza, Pakistani-Zimbabwean cricketer

Places
 Secunderabad, a city in Telangana, India
 Sekandar, Markazi, a village in Markazi Province, Iran
 Sikandar, Iran, a village in Sistan and Baluchestan Province, Iran
 Sikandar Bagh, a fortified villa and garden in Lucknow, India, a sepoy stronghold during the Indian Mutiny

Media
 Sikandar (1941 film), a Bollywood film directed by Sohrab Modi
 Sikandar (2009 film), a Bollywood film directed by Piyush Jha

See also
 Iskandar
 İskender